Charles Ahern (25 June 1905 – 7 April 1931) was an Australian rules footballer who played for Collingwood in the Victorian Football League (VFL).

Despite having played just two VFL games, in rounds nine and 12 earlier in the year, Ahern was a surprise pick in Collingwood's side for the 1929 Grand Final. Collingwood won and Ahern became the least experienced premiership player in the history of the club. It would also be his last appearance as he suffered a fractured arm during the game and died of a subsequent illness 18 months later. Charlie was married to Evelyn Jane Ahern née Smith who was looked after by the Collingwood Club and Community following her tragic loss. She remarried a fellow Collingwood supporter and inhabitant Norman Francis some years later.

References

Holmesby, Russell and Main, Jim (2007). The Encyclopedia of AFL Footballers. 7th ed. Melbourne: Bas Publishing.

1905 births
1931 deaths
Australian rules footballers from Victoria (Australia)
Collingwood Football Club players
Collingwood Football Club Premiership players
Infectious disease deaths in Australia
One-time VFL/AFL Premiership players